Teudelinda (5th-century – d. 501) was a Burgundian queen consort by marriage to king Godegisel.

She is known for her Pro-Christian activity and mentioned in the hagiographies of local saints. 

She was executed along with her spouse and children by her brother-in-law Gundobad after the rebellion of her spouse in 501.

References 

Burgundian queens consort
5th-century women
501 deaths
5th-century births
Executed royalty